The frail gourami (Ctenops nobilis) is a species of gourami native to northeastern India and Bangladesh found in lakes, ponds, rivers, and streams with plentiful vegetation overgrowth. It is only seldom found in the aquarium trade, courtesy of its extreme sensitivity to shipping stress and high levels of aggression. This species is the only known member of its genus.

References

frail gourami
Freshwater fish of India
Fish of Bangladesh
frail gourami